Knyazhevo may refer to:

Places in Bulgaria 
 , a neighbourhood of Sofia
 Knyazhevo, Haskovo Province, a village

Places in Russia 
 Knyazhevo, Nikolsky District, Vologda Oblast
 Knyazhevo, Sokolsky District, Vologda Oblast
 Knyazhevo, Vologodsky District, Vologda Oblast

See also 
 Knyazevo (disambiguation)